Elyria Catholic High School (ECHS) is a private Catholic high school located in Elyria, Ohio, United States. It is affiliated with the Roman Catholic Diocese of Cleveland and is the only Catholic high school in Lorain County. Elyria Catholic was built in 1949 and a physical education complex and economics lab was completed in 2007. The school colors are forest green, white, and black and athletic teams are known as the Panthers. The school is a member of the Great Lakes Conference.

State championships

 Football – 1976, 1983, 1984 
 Boys cross country – 1973, 1974, 1977, 1978 
 Boys cross country - state runners-up: 1972, 1979, 1983, 2009

Notable alumni
 Matt Wilhelm - Class of 1999 - professional football player in the National Football League (NFL) 
 Brianne McLaughlin - Class of 2005 - Named to the U.S. women's ice hockey team at the 2010 Winter Olympics.

References

External links

Catholic secondary schools in Ohio
Elyria, Ohio
High schools in Lorain County, Ohio
Roman Catholic Diocese of Cleveland